In the mathematical field of graph theory, the Robertson graph or (4,5)-cage, is a 4-regular undirected graph with 19 vertices and 38 edges named after Neil Robertson.

The Robertson graph is the unique (4,5)-cage graph and was discovered by Robertson in 1964. As a cage graph, it is the smallest 4-regular graph with girth 5.

It has chromatic number 3, chromatic index 5, diameter 3, radius 3 and is both  4-vertex-connected and 4-edge-connected. It has book thickness 3 and queue number 2. 

The Robertson graph is also a Hamiltonian graph which possesses  distinct directed Hamiltonian cycles.

The Robertson graph is one of the smallest graphs with cop number 4.

Algebraic properties
The Robertson graph is not a vertex-transitive graph and its full automorphism group is isomorphic to the dihedral group of order 24, the group of symmetries of a regular dodecagon, including both rotations and reflections.

The characteristic polynomial of the Robertson graph is

Gallery

References 

Individual graphs
Regular graphs